Karlström is a surname. Notable people with the surname include:

Birgitta Karlström Dorph (born 1939), Swedish diplomat
Fredrik Karlström (born 1998), Swedish ice hockey player
Hugo Karlström (1873-?), Swedish politician
Jesper Karlström (born 1995), Swedish footballer
Joel Karlström (born 2001), Finnish footballer
Jonas Karlström (born 1978), Swedish actor
Marcus Karlström (born 1995), Swedish ice hockey player
Niklas Karlström, Swedish footballer
Perseus Karlström (born 1990), Swedish racewalker

See also 
 Karlstrøm

Swedish-language surnames